KHAM (103.1  FM) is a commercial radio station that is licensed to serve the Britt, Iowa area.  KHAM is licensed to Coloff Media, LLC.
KHAM was granted a construction permit by the F.C.C. to relocate the transmitter and increase power to 10 kilowatts as a C3 station. This will provide a city grade signal to many communities such as Belmond and Clarion which are between the Mason City clusters and the Fort Dodge group.
KHAM was first licensed on October 18, 2002.

KHAM has a construction permit with the Federal Communications Commission to become a Class C3 station; the effective radiated power will be 10 kilowatts and the antenna height above average terrain will be .

References

External links
Coloff Media List of Stations
KIOW/KHAM Facebook

HAM
Radio stations established in 2006
2006 establishments in Iowa